Klubi i Futbollit Oriku is an Albanian football club based in Orikum in the Vlorë District. The club currently competes in the Kategoria e Parë.

History
The club was founded in 1955 by the Orikum Municipality and it was named after nearby Ancient city Oricum, which is called Oriku in Albanian. In their first season they competed in the Albanian Third Division where they finished top of Group A, but lost in the play-off final against Partizani B.

Current squad

Personnel and Staf

References

 
Football clubs in Albania
Sport in Vlorë
Association football clubs established in 1955
1955 establishments in Albania
Albanian Third Division clubs
Kategoria e Dytë clubs